This is a list of chancellors of the Order of Australia. The position is held by the person who occupies the office of Governor-General of Australia.

Governors-General become Chancellor of the Order on assuming the office of Governor-General.  The formal title of this position reflects the rank of the incumbent within the Order of Australia, which has changed over time along with the statutes of the order (see 'Brief history' below). The office is referred to as Chancellor and Principal Knight if the incumbent is a 'Knight of the Order of Australia' (AK), as Chancellor and Principal Dame if the incumbent is a 'Dame of the Order of Australia' (AD), or as Chancellor and Principal Companion if the incumbent is a 'Companion of the Order of Australia' (AC).

List of chancellors

Brief history
The Order of Australia is the only Australian order of chivalry (although certain dynastic British orders of chivalry, such as the Order of the Garter, the Order of the Thistle and the Royal Victorian Order, may still be awarded to Australians by the Monarch). It was established on 14 February 1975 by the Monarch to recognise Australian citizens and other persons for achievement, meritorious service, or for both. At its establishment, the Order of Australia included three grades: Companion, Officer and Member, and two Divisions: Civil and Military.

On 24 May 1976, the grades of Knight (AK) and Dame (AD), and the Medal of the Order of Australia, were established by the Monarch on the advice of Prime Minister Malcolm Fraser, and the Civil Division was renamed the General Division.  Knight and Dame of the Order of Australia superseded Companion of the Order as the highest grade, however Knight/Dame is only awarded in the General Division of the Order.

Recipients who are not Australian citizens may be appointed Honorary Knights or Dames, although no such appointments have yet been made.  Although Heir to the Australian throne, Charles, Prince of Wales, is not an Australian citizen; to avoid his appointment being as an Honorary Knight, the Constitution of the Order of Australia was amended by Letters Patent to enable him to be a substantive Knight.

Following the 1983 election, Prime Minister Bob Hawke advised the abolition of the Knight and Dame grades. On 3 March 1986, the Monarch co-signed Letters Patent revoking the categories of Knight and Dame – existing Knights and Dames were not affected by this change. Following his election in 2013, Prime Minister Tony Abbott advised the Queen to reinstate the categories of Dame and Knight. In March 2014, the Queen co-signed Letters Patent to bring this into effect.

See also
 Australian knights and dames
 Living Australian knights and dames
 List of Knights and Dames of the Order of Australia
 List of Companions of the Order of Australia

References

Order of Australia